Wolfgang Blochwitz (8 February 1941 – 8 May 2005) was a football goalkeeper from East Germany.

Playing career 
During his club career he played for 1. FC Magdeburg (1960–1966) and FC Carl Zeiss Jena (1966–1976). He made 275 appearances in the East German top flight.

He played 17 matches (19 if Olympic matches were also counted) for the East Germany national football team and was a backup keeper at the 1974 FIFA World Cup.

Career after football 
He was chairman at Carl Zeiss Jena between 1988 and 1990.

External links

References

1941 births
2005 deaths
Association football goalkeepers
German footballers
East German footballers
East Germany international footballers
1974 FIFA World Cup players
1. FC Magdeburg players
FC Carl Zeiss Jena players
DDR-Oberliga players
People from Mittelsachsen
Footballers from Saxony